Ballintubber GAA is a Gaelic Athletic Association club, based in Ballintubber, County Mayo, Ireland. The club is a member of the Mayo GAA county board, and fields Gaelic football teams in competitions run by the board. Ballintubber's home pitch is located at the Ray Prendergast Memorial Park, Carrowkeel, Clogher, Claremorris, Co. Mayo. Ireland.

Achievements
 Mayo Senior Football Championship Winners 2010, 2011, 2014, 2018 2019
 Connacht Intermediate Club Football Championship Runner-Up 2007
 Mayo Intermediate Football Championship Winners 1976, 1990, 2007  Runners-Up 1967, 1968, 1969, 1987, 1997, 1999, 2003
 Mayo Junior Football Championship Runners-Up 1960, 1975
 Mayo Under-21 A Football Championship Winners 1976, 2008, 2009  Runners-Up 1999, 2010
 Mayo Minor A Football Championship Winners 2004

Notable players
 Paddy Prendergast
 Bryan Walsh
 Alan Dillon
 Diarmuid O'Connor
 Cillian O'Connor
 Jason Gibbons
 Michael Plunkett
 James Horan

References

External sources
 Ballintubber GAA club site

Gaelic games clubs in County Mayo
Gaelic football clubs in County Mayo